Olešná is a village and municipality in Čadca District in the Žilina Region of northern Slovakia.

History
In historical records the village was first mentioned in 1619.

Geography
The municipality lies at an altitude of 480 metres and covers an area of 19.774 km2. It has a population of about 2074 people.

External links
http://www.obecolesna.sk/
http://www.statistics.sk/mosmis/eng/run.html

Villages and municipalities in Čadca District